Yusuf Barak is a retired German-Afghan footballer and current manager of KSV Baunatal C-Junioren.

Club career stats
Last update: 17 November 2017

External links

2011 transfer to Hessen Kassel II
Yusuf Barak

Afghan men's footballers
1984 births
Living people
Footballers from Kabul
Afghan emigrants to Germany
Association football defenders
Afghanistan international footballers